Jigme Singye Wangchuck National Park (formerly Black Mountains National Park) covers an area of  in central Bhutan. It protects a large area of the  Black Mountains, a sub−range of the Himalayan Range System.

The park occupies most of the Trongsa District, as well as parts of: Sarpang, Tsirang, Wangdue Phodrang, and Zhemgang Districts.

The park is bound to the east by the Mangde Chhu, and reaches the Sankosh River−Punatsangchu basin to the west. Jigme Singye abuts Royal Manas National Park to the southeast.

Along the border of the park from the north to the southeast run Bhutan's main east-west and north-south highways. It is also connected via biological corridors to other national parks in northern, eastern, central, and southern Bhutan. Habitats of the Eastern Himalayan broadleaf forests ecoregion are protected within the park

Geography
Jigme Singye Wangchuck National Park is the most centrally located among the national parks of Bhutan. Covering over an area of 1730 km2, it forms a contiguous belt linking Royal Manas National Park in the south to the temperate and alpine vegetation in the north. The park mainly falls under political jurisdiction of five districts namely Tsirang, Sarpang, Wangdue, Zhemgang and Trongsa.

Significance
JSWNP represents the best example of the mid-Himalayan ecosystems of the Eastern Himalaya that contain several ecological biomes ranging from sub-tropical forests at lower altitudes to alpine meadows at its highest altitudes. It is the only park that contains an old growth Chir pine forest (Pinus roxburghii). The park is also vital for various migratory faunal species, particularly migratory birds due to its wide range in altitude and vegetation, and central location in the country. It covers wide range of habitat types from permanent ice atop Durshingla peak (Black Mountain), alpine lakes and pastures, down through conifer and broad-leaved forests to temperate forest and sub-tropical forests. The park protects the largest and biodiversity richest temperate forest area in the entire Himalayas.

The high mountains in the central regions of the national park are an important watershed for the streams and rivers that become the headwaters and tributaries of the Mangde Chhu River to the west. The Nika Cchu joins the Mangde Chhu from the north.

Administration

Head Office
The park headoffice is located in Tshangkha, near the national highway in the Trongsa District.

The park has four administrative Park Ranges (divisions), with their own range offices (shown in map 2).

Taksha Park Range
Oversees the Athang Gewog of Wangdiphodrang Dzongkhag and Sergithang Gewog of Tsirang Dzongkhag .

Langthel Park Range
Oversees the Tangsibji Gewog and Langthil Gewogs.

Tingtibi Park Range
Covers the Trong Gewog in Zhemgang Dzongkhag.

Nabji Park Range
Covers Korphu Gewog in Trongsa and Jigmechhoeling Gewog in Sarpang Dzongkhag. This range covers the most remotest areas in the park. This range is even home to some of the most important historic sites such as the Nabji Lhakhang.

In addition to the 4 Park Ranges, the park also has 2 administrative Deputy Ranges (subdistricts), the Chendebji Deputy Range within the Langthel Park Range, and Athang Deputy Range within the Taksha Park Range. 

Staffing

Jigme Singye Wangchuck National Park is currently served by 38 staff people, composed of 34 technical staff people and 4 non-technical staff people. They are spread over the park, and based at the Park Headquarters, or at 1 of the 6 Park Range or Deputy Range offices.

Mission and goals
The mission of the park is to "Conserve and manage its Natural Biodiversity in Harmony with People's Values and Aspirations".  The mission is supported by the following goals:
 Conserve, protect and maintain the viability of specific ecosystems, and animal and plant communities in a way that will allow natural processes of succession and evolution to continue with minimal human influence.
 Protect cultural, historical and religious sites.
 Contribute to the socio-economic development of park residents through sustainable use of park natural resources.

Future plans
The park emphasizes research and monitoring, wildlife management, conservation education, sustainable livelihoods, and the improvement of social welfare of communities in and around the park. It encourages the local inhabitants to engage in community based ecotourism projects and services, for the improvement of their living standards and sustaining their local environment and biodiversity.

Achievements
Since its gazettement in 1995, Jigme Singye Wangchuck National Park has effectively delivered the forestry service to the park residents and efficiently managed the natural heritages through tireless efforts. The national park has delivered many Integrated Conservation and Development Programmes through various funding agencies to the local communities, the striking ones being the establishment of Nabji-Korphu Community based Ecotourism, Adha-Rukha Community Trail, supplying of CGI Sheets to the economically backward residents.

In terms of conservation, the national park has conducted many surveys like biological corridor survey to assess the functionality of various corridors connecting other protected area systems, biodiversity survey to ascertain the biodiversity richness of the national park, tiger survey to relate predator prey dynamics, anti poaching patrolling activities to inspect poaching incidents and apprehend the culprits, thus securing a wildlife habitats.

Functional Sections
The Park has four functional sections located within the head Office besides the park range offices.

These are;

Research and Monitoring Section
This is the unit which oversees and coordinate all the researches within the national park.

Forest Protection and Land Use Section
This section acts as the main body of the park in protecting the flora and fauna of the park. It is also responsible for the management of the information of the data on resource utilization by the park residents. This section also looks after the issuance of forestry clearance and deals with various wildlife offences which take place in the park.

Integrated Conservation and Development Programme Section
This section looks after all socio-economic activities within the park. It also act as functional linkage between the conservation and the developmental activities within the national park.

Social Forestry and Extension Section
This section looks after all the activities related to the plantations, private forestry and the community forests within the national park.

Natural history
The park's north-central region has an especially rugged topography, with peaks rising to almost  in elevation, while the southern areas are relatively less steep and rugged.

Geologically, the mountains are moderately recent and steep-sided, consisting largely of Pre-Cambrian and early Paleozoic quartzite and gneiss, with some areas with sedimentary limestone, dolomite, sandstone and shales. The soils are generally clay loam, with good permeability and moderate moisture retention.

Hydrology
The eastern boundary of the park, from Trongsa to Tingtibi is defined by Mangde Chhu river, whereas Punatsangchu touches the mid-western part of the park in Taksha. Nika chhu river drains the Chendebji valley in the northern part of the park by joining the Mangdechu river. Numerous other streams and rivulets originate from the snow-fed alpine lakes in Black Mountain area, and melting snow and monsoon rain contribute to the water volume. This network of small perennial and annual tributaries flow down the steep slopes, often as waterfalls, and along the valleys to become tributaries of the larger rivers. The distinct rainy and dry seasons results in wide seasonal variations in the river flows, with large volumes of sediment-laden water flowing during the monsoon and low volume during the dry, winter season.

The local communities also rely on the water from these rivers for domestic and for irrigation, and contributing to the withdrawal from the rivers.

There are several major hydropower plants being constructed along the Rivers of Punatsangchu, Mangdechu and the Nika chu, which fall on the border of the national park.

Climate
The wide elevation range and the mountainous terrain create complex climatic conditions, from wet sub-tropical in the south to cold temperate in the northern high elevation areas. The southwest monsoon from June to September contributes most of the annual rainfall. The rain shadows imposed by the high mountain ranges result in localized rainfall gradients during this period.

Ecology
The park has a large area of relatively undisturbed natural habitats. Together with Manas Tiger Reserve and the Royal Manas National Park in the south and the Jigme Dorji National Park and Wangchuck Centennial National Park in the north, Jigme Singye Wangchuck National Park is centrally located in one of the largest, most diverse protected area complexes in Asia, with dramatically different but contiguous habitats and ecotones changing across massive altitudinal differences that rise from the low tropical to high alpine elevations.

The park has includes portions of six ecoregions.
They include:
 Himalayan subtropical broadleaf forests
 Himalayan subtropical pine forests — predominant flora is a thin woodland of drought-resistant Pinus roxburghii (Chir pines).
 Eastern Himalayan broadleaf forests
Warm broadleaf forests 
Cool temperate broadleaf forests
 Eastern Himalayan subalpine conifer forests.
 Eastern Himalayan alpine shrub and meadows.

Biodiversity
The wide altitudinal range, highly dissected and complex terrain, and representation of 6 ecoregions and 2 zoogeographical realms within the national park create a notable biodiversity, with diverse flora and fauna species found in various ecosystems, habitats, and plant communities.

The native plants and animals include several rare endangered species listed in Schedule 1 of the 'Forest and Nature Conservation Act of Bhutan, 1995' implemented in the 'Forest and nature conservation Rules of Bhutan, 2006,'   and the IUCN Red List.

The Constitution of the Kingdom of Bhutan mandates the country to maintain at least 60% of Bhutan under forest cover for all times to come, and to maintain the country as carbon neutral and so a net carbon sink over time.

Mammals

The mammal fauna includes a mix of Palearctic and Indo-Malayan species. The first Conservation Management Plan (Jan 2001-June 2010) for the park enlisted 57 mammals but most of which are yet unconfirmed. The presence of 19 mammals were confirmed based on direct sightings and indirect evidences. A rapid biodiversity survey in 2002 listed 22 mammals, of which 11 were identified as mammals of conservation interest. The mammal survey in 2012 confirmed the presence of 26 mammals in the park. The current figure of 39 mammals is reached after the intensive camera trapping works done in 2013-2015 for the Tiger Revalidation Survey works.

Mammal distribution
Sub-tropical broadleaf forests
Mammal species found in this type of forest are tiger, clouded leopard, leopard, dhole, golden cat, jungle cat, leopard, gaur, muntjac, sambar, golden langur, grey langur and black giant squirrel.
Chir pine forests
The chir pine forests are found in the south western and southeastern parts of the national park and are usually found in drier areas. Camera trap surveys recorded the presence of muntjac, sambar, serow, wild boar, goral, leopard, golden cat, leopard cat, dhole, yellow-throated marten and black panther
Warm broadleaf forests

The camera trap surveys revealed the highest number of mammal species in this habitat. High percentage of barking deer and sambar from this forest type. Other mammals found in this forest type include gaur, and wild boar. The endangered golden langur is also found in this type of forest.
Cool broadleaf forests
10 species of mammals were confirmed from this forest type within the park from camera trap surveys which includes the Bengal tiger, Himalayan black bear and yellow-throated marten.
Mixed conifer forests
The mixed conifer forests which is found between 2000 m to 3200 m represents a transition from the broadleaf to conifer forests. 10 species of mammals were confirmed from this forest type including the Bengal tiger.
Blue pine forests
Blue pine forests are predominantly found in the western part of the park between 2100 m to 3000 m. Only mammal species recorded from this forest types is the yellow-throated marten.
Fir forests
Stands of old fir can be found on the higher ridges between 3200 m to around 4000 m. This forest type provides important habitat for red panda, musk deer, and the Himalayan serow. Himalayan serow is one of the main prey for the Bengal tiger.
Juniper forests
This type of forest forms the transitional zone between the treeline and the alpine meadows.
Alpine meadows and scrub
This scrubby vegetation usually occurs above 4000 m above sea level. This type of forest is isolated from the extensive alpine habitats along the northern areas of Bhutan. Probable mammal species found here are Tibetan wolf.

Schedule I mammals recorded

Birds

270 bird species have been recorded in the park. From the 270 recorded birds, eight are Globally threatened and thus fall under Schedule I of the FNCA, 1995. Phobjikha Valley, which falls in the buffer zone of the park is also a very important winter habitat for the migrating black-necked cranes. The park is also a very important habitat of the critically endangered white-bellied herons in Bhutan. Places such as Tingtibi and Nabji-Korphu is a very important habitat of the rufous-necked hornbill (Aceros nipalensis). The park is also a home to the populations of endangered great hornbill and wood snipe.

Majority of the birds recorded in the park are altitudinal migrant species who uses the park as a seasonal migration route between their summer and winter habitats.

Herpetofauna
A total of 42 species of herpetofauna was recorded from the National Park.
The breakdown is as follows.
 Snakes: 24 species 
 Lizards: 8 species 
 Frogs: 9 species
 Turtle: 1 species

Fishes

Butterflies
359 species of butterflies have been recorded in a recent survey from the park and the buffer zones.

Human communities

Diversity of communities reside within the park which includes some of the first settlers in the country; the Oleps  in Rukha village in Athang Gewog and the Monpa communities in Jangbi, Wangling, and Phrumzur villages in Langthil Gewog, and the Reti community under Jigmechhoeling Gewog, in Sarpang Dzongkhag. More than 5000 people reside within the multiple use zones of the park.

The three villages of Korphu, Nabji and Nimshong from the Korphu Gewog have the highest number of households, whereas the settlements in Athang Gewog are small and scattered. Overall, Korphu, Trong, and Tangsibji Gewogs have a smaller number but larger sized villages, whereas Langthel and Athang Gewogs have several scattered villages. The people from these villages depend on the natural resources in the national park for their livelihoods.

The major sources of livelihoods for the communities in the park are agriculture and livestock rearing, with some income from non-wood forest products. Some households also engage in labor-based wage earning, especially in the RGoB sectors. These are mostly in villages closer to towns and infrastructure project sites, where jobs are available. Casual labour is highest in Langthel, Korphu, and Athang Gewogs, whereas trade-based cash income is highest in Trong Gewog.

Livestock rearing
Jigme Singye Wangchuck National Park spans over 10 Gewogs under five political jurisdiction of five Dzongkhags. The communities within these 10 Gewogs draw their livelihood on agriculture, cattle grazing, timber, fuel wood, non-wood forest products, and numerous forest products. The park is also used as pastureland for over six months each year by a huge number of migratory cattle and yak herders.

Winter grazing grounds

In Jigme Singye Wangchuck National Park, the winter grazing grounds are found in tropical and sub-tropical regions. Such regions are generally too hot to reside in the summer and the forests and meadows are infested with diversity of weeds. The rivers swell too big that crossing from one valley to another is impossible during summers in such areas. These areas are best suited for grazing in winter when rivers are shallow and weather becomes moderate.

The migratory cattle herders from Chumey in Bumthang travel to this low altitude pasture lands when the climate in the alpine and temperate becomes unbearable for the livestock. Many migratory herders from Bumthang own many tracts of tsamdrogs located at different vegetation zones and altitudes and allow them to migrate from one place to another with their cattle at different seasons. Cattle are moved and rotated among winter tsamdrogs very meticulously based on years of experience. The days are carefully divided for each tsamdrog to sustain the whole winter while also mitigating grazing pressure.

Summer grazing grounds

Summer grazing grounds are located at temperate and alpine regions where cattle migrate when climate in tropical and sub-tropical regions become hot and humid. However, the park has less summer grazing ground.

In the Black Mountain regions, yaks from Phobjikha Valley graze in the alpine meadows during summer. The yaks migrate to the lower altitude areas of the Phobjikha Valley during winters when Black Mountain remains shrouded in snow.

There are six yak herders from Phobjikha Valley who migrate to the pastures in Black Mountain, each owning an average of 56 yaks. It is likely that over 300 yaks will graze in the limited pastures in rotation for around 5 months from May to September.

When cattle migrate to summer grazing grounds at temperate and sub-alpine regions, the yaks move up to higher altitudes in alpine areas. When the cattle migrate to winter grazing grounds at sub-tropical and tropical regions, the yaks move to lower altitudes in winter.

Ecotourism

Nabji-Korphu Trek- The first Community based Nature Tourism in Bhutan
This is the trek that will take you to remote rural communities of Central Bhutan in 6 days. Nabji-Korphu Community Based Nature Tourism is the first of its kind in Bhutan (as opposed to conventional travel-agent organized treks/tours in Bhutan). The Nabji-Korphu trail takes you through 6 rural communities. You can immerse yourself in the daily lives and farming chores of the local communities while helping them to conserve environment as well as their cultural and historical heritage. It is a 6days/5nights low altitude trek. Your travel will give rural communities additional source of income to supplement their livelihood from subsistence farming.

About Nabji-Korphu Community Based Nature Tourism

Nabji-Korphu Community Based Nature Tourism runs through six villages in Lower Trongsa District of Central Bhutan. The trekking trail and the villages fall within Jigme Singye Wangchuck National Park. It is a 6 days/5 nights low altitude winter trek with elevation ranging from 1000-1700 masl. The trek is a unique cultural and natural experience which combines rich biological diversity, rural Bhutanese communities and a medium level trek. The trek is also of historical significance as the trail follows the route believed to have been taken by Guru Rinpoche when he visited Bhutan in the 8th century.

Management of the Community Based Nature Tourism

The trail has been developed in such a way that communities will have the sole responsibility to manage and provide services. Each village along the route has a village Tourism Management Committee (TCM) composed of 4-5 elected community representatives.

Attractions

The Nabji-Korphu Trail is a low altitude winter trek open from mid-October to end of March. The trail takes one through the home of mane rare and endangered wildlife species. golden langur, rufous-necked hornbill and many other wild orchids and flowering plants.

Adha-Rukha Community Based Tourism
JSWNP is initiating 6 days/5 nights Community-based Nature Tourism in western part of the National park. The trek will run through villages of Adha and Rukha villages under Wangdue District. The highlight of the trekking is rural people of Oleps with a dying language, habitat of critically endangered white-bellied heron, and the authentic rural village life which can be experienced in the home-stays of the villagers. You can also try fishing in Rukha’s Hara-chhu river (the first community managed fishing group in Bhutan), and prepare stone-dried fish.

See also
 List of protected areas of Bhutan
Wildlife in Bhutan
 Black-necked cranes in Bhutan
Forestry in Bhutan
List of Hot Springs and Mineral Springs of Bhutan

References

National parks of Bhutan
Eastern Himalayan broadleaf forests
Sarpang District
Tsirang District
Trongsa District
Wangdue Phodrang District
Zhemgang District
Protected areas established in 1995
1995 establishments in Bhutan
Important Bird Areas of Bhutan
Protected areas of Bhutan